How Do You Do is the second studio album by American singer Mayer Hawthorne. It was released on October 11, 2011, by Universal Republic Records. The limited edition box set of the album gave Hawthorne his first Grammy Award nomination for Best Boxed or Special Limited Edition Package in 2014.

Singles 
The album's lead single, "A Long Time", was released on May 23, 2011, its music video was released on September 5, 2011. The album's second single, "The Walk", was released on August 29, 2011, its music video was released on October 5, 2011, the song peaked at number 32 on the US Hot Rock & Alternative Songs.

Critical reception 

How Do You Do was met with generally positive reviews. At Metacritic, which assigns a normalized rating out of 100 to reviews from professional publications, the album received an average score of 78, based on 19 reviews. Aggregator AnyDecentMusic? gave it 6.7 out of 10, based on their assessment of the critical consensus.

AllMusic editor David Jeffries commented that Hawthorne's songwriting ability compliments his "adherence to an aesthetic" and "love of nostalgic soul", and stated, "that the man sounds more natural and loose than on his debut might be this album's greatest asset, making the vulgar drops and other nods to the present feel less mannered than before". Barry Walters of Spin called Hawthorne a "credible crooner" and commented that "his increasingly confident cries and grooves and songwriting aplomb are undeniably pro". Colin McGuire of PopMatters dubbed it "Hawthorne's masterpiece to date" and stated, "What makes How Do You Do so much better than the singer's debut [...] is his foray into up-tempo groove-happy soul music". Los Angeles Times writer August Brown complimented its "fantastic pillow talk" and wrote that the album "splits the difference between the well-ironed soul revivalism of Adele and R. Kelly's baroquely dirty mind". Brown added that Hawthorne "comes into his own as a vocal powerhouse" and commended the production as "refined and dynamic in a way that's wholly missing from pop radio".

However, Slant Magazines Jonathan Keefe found Hawthorne's singing "technically poor" and marred by a "shaky sense of pitch". Keefe noted its musicianship as "simply flawless in recreating a '70s-era R&B groove" and stated, "Hawthorne just doesn't have the vocal chops to pull off an otherwise solid album". Rolling Stone writer Chuck Eddy found "Hawthorne's oldschool pop-R&B homages [...] so meticulous that it's tempting to overrate his pipes", and concluded, "Don't expect emotion for the ages, and you'll have fun with this". In his consumer guide, critic Robert Christgau indicating "the kind of garden-variety good record that is the great luxury of musical micromarketing and overproduction". He called the album a "civically revivalist Motown / Ford homage" and stated, "What we're hearing here is the Temptations turning into the Delfonics—the way his midrange gives up the verse and his falsetto takes the chorus is as nice as his boyish sexism".

Industry awards

Track listing

Notes
 "A Long Time" features additional vocals by Noelle Scaggs
 "The Walk" features additional vocals by JimiJames
 "You Called Me" features additional vocals by JimiJames

Personnel 
Credits for How Do You Do adapted from AllMusic.

Musicians

 Joseph Abrams – bass 
 Hubert Alexander – piano, piano (electric) 
 Rebecca Bowman – finger snaps 
 Jamall Bufford – finger snaps 
 Kenza Chaouai – handclapping 
 Dennis Coffey – guitar
 Roman Gianarthur – strings 
 JimiJames – vocals 
 Quentin Joseph – drums 
 Justin Jozwiak – sax (tenor) 

 Stephen Kaye – strings 
 Jeffrey Klein – handclapping 
 Quincy McCrary – piano 
 Topher Mohr – guitar 
 David Moyer – sax (baritone), saxophone 
 Noelle Scaggs – vocals 
 Harlan Silverman – guitar 
 Todd Simon – euphonium, flugelhorn, French horn, trumpet 
 Snoop Dogg – vocals 
 Christian Wunderlich – guitar 

Production
 Cedric Bihr – photography 
 Henry DeMaio – photography 
 Tom Elmhirst – mixing 
 Chris Gehringer – mastering 
 Mayer Hawthorne – art direction, engineer, mixing, musician, producer, vocals 
 Jeff Lank – text 
 Chris Piascik – lettering 
 Kevin Scanlon – photography 
 Jason Schweitzer – mixing 
 Robert Winter – photography

Charts

Weekly charts

Year-end charts

References

External links 
 
 
 

2011 albums
Mayer Hawthorne albums
Universal Republic Records albums